Henry "Harry" Edward Thomas was a New Zealand professional rugby league footballer who played in the 1920s.

International honours
Thomas represented New Zealand in 1925 against Australia, and on the 1926–1927 New Zealand rugby league tour of Great Britain against Wales.

References

New Zealand national rugby league team players
New Zealand rugby league players
Otago rugby league team players
Place of birth missing
Place of death missing
Rugby league second-rows
Year of birth missing
Year of death missing